How We Came To Live Here is an independently published role-playing game written by Brennan Taylor and published by Galileo Games.

Development
Brennan Taylor began work on a role-playing game based on the legends of the ancestral Puebloans in 2005, but had then set it aside to instead finish Mortal Coil. He began work again in fall 2006, calling it "The Fifth World", but had to change the name because of the impending publication of a post-apocalyptic RPG called The Fifth World (2006).  Taylor publicly asked for comments on a number of alternative names including "Twin Souls," "Up from the Fourth World," "So That This World Will Not Be Destroyed," "Into the Light," and "How We Came to Live Here"; Taylor would eventually settle on the last, because it evoked the mythic feeling of the game. The game that would become How We Came to Live Here originally used the mechanics of Clinton Nixon's The Shadow of Yesterday, but Taylor found this confining, and it soon progressed from being a clone of The Shadow of Yesterday to being a game influenced by The Shadow of Yesterday. How We Came to Live Here was previewed as an online ashcan in July 2008, and then released in a final edition in March 2010.

Setting 
How We Came to Live Here has what Shannon Appelcline describes as "an evocative southwestern setting — something that was near to Taylor's heart due to his youth spent growing up in Tucson, Arizona. There's lots of background on the culture and life of the Pueblo People; Taylor builds on that by including myths in the rules text itself."

The game is inspired by the legends and folkways of the pre-Columbian American southwest.

System 
According to Shannon Appelcline,
 Appelcline also described two elements of the game that he found particularly notable:

The game is predicated on a rich relationship map that defines both individuals and potential sources of trouble within a village.
How We Came To Live Here uses Fudge dice for resolution - pools of dice with positive, null, or negative results.

References

External links  
 Galileo Games' home page for How We Came To Live Here

Fantasy role-playing games
Indie role-playing games
Role-playing games introduced in 2010